Belarus participated in the Junior Eurovision Song Contest 2015 with the song "Volshebstvo (Magic)" written by Vitaliy Kurovskiy, Ruslan Aslanov. The song was performed by Ruslan Aslanov. The Belarusian entry for the 2015 contest in Sofia, Bulgaria was selected through a national final organised by the Belarusian broadcaster National State Television and Radio Company of the Republic of Belarus (BTRC). The national final consisted of ten competing acts participating in a televised production where the winner was determined by a 50/50 combination of both telephone vote and the votes of jury members made up of music professionals. After winning both the televote and jury vote, Ruslan Aslanov and his song "Volshebstvo" were declared the winners.

Background

Prior to the 2015 Contest, Belarus had participated in the Junior Eurovision Song Contest twelve times since its first entry in 2003. Belarus has won the contest on two occasions: in 2005 with the song "My vmeste" performed by Ksenia Sitnik and in 2007 with the song "S druz'yami performed by Alexey Zhigalkovich. In 2014 Belarus placed 7th out of 16 entries with the song "Sokal" performed by Nadezhda Misyakova.

Before Junior Eurovision

National final 
The final took place on 21 August 2015, hosted by Dmitry Novik and Ilya Volkov. Ruslan Aslanov won both the jury and public vote in Belarus and he was declared the winner of the Belarusian national selection.

Artist and song information

Ruslan Aslanov
Ruslan Aslanov is a child singer who represented Belarus in the Junior Eurovision Song Contest 2015 with his song "Volshebstvo (Magic)". Ruslan ended in 4th place with 105 points.

Thanks to the wisdom of his grandmother, Ruslan has had much success singing and performing. He won first place and accolades in competitions and festivals that include ‘Voice: Ukraine’ and ‘New Wave Russia’. In his free time, Ruslan says that he’s always ready to play tennis and football with friends.

He also likes to help his parents at home and playing computer games. As for performers, he would like to sing along with Christina Aguilera (she is unbelievable) and Bruno Mars (he has a cool voice) and both Teo and Uzari who represented Belarus in the Eurovision Song Contest in 2014 and 2015 respectively. He was also a  green room host at the Belarusian national final for Junior Eurovision in 2018.

Ruslan dreams to win a Grammy award for himself one day.

At Junior Eurovision
At the running order draw which took place on 15 November 2015, Belarus were drawn to perform tenth on 21 November 2015, following  and preceding .

Final
Performing from a small raised platform, Ruslan gave several very emotional and passionate performances. The backdrop for this performance was a tree with changing colours and various effects. With one move of his arm, Ruslan was able to change the background effects through the song, creating his magic on stage. As they key change was coming in, as well as the switching of the song into English, the tree was set alight to bring the final crescendo of song.

At the end of the voting, Belarus placed 4th with 105 points.

Voting
The voting during the final consisted of 50 percent public televoting and 50 percent from a jury deliberation. The jury consisted of five music industry professionals who were citizens of the country they represent, with their names published before the contest to ensure transparency. This jury was asked to judge each contestant based on: vocal capacity; the stage performance; the song's composition and originality; and the overall impression by the act. In addition, no member of a national jury could be related in any way to any of the competing acts in such a way that they cannot vote impartially and independently. The individual rankings of each jury member were released one month after the final.

Following the release of the full split voting by the EBU after the conclusion of the competition, it was revealed that Belarus had placed seventh with the public televote and third with the jury vote. In the public vote, Belarus scored 61 points, while with the jury vote, Belarus scored 101 points.

Below is a breakdown of points awarded to Belarus and awarded by Belarus in the final and the breakdown of the jury voting and televoting conducted during the final.

Detailed voting results
The following members comprised the Belarusian jury:
 Iskui Abalyan
 Alena Trashchynskaya
 Tatsiana Siamionava
 Uri Naurotski
 Anatoliy Mukalay

Notes

References

Junior Eurovision Song Contest
Belarus
2015